Red Rock Entertainment Ltd was a film investment and production company based at Elstree Film Studios in Borehamwood, Hertfordshire (UK). The company acts as executive producers sourcing investment and finance for film and TV projects. Gary Collins is the CEO of Red Rock Entertainment.

Background

Red Rock Entertainment mainly works on projects that are at an advanced stage and are looking for the final amount of financing. As an executive producer, Red Rock Entertainment arranges for investors to visit sets during filming, appear as extras and attend private screenings. It also arranges seminars at Elstree Studios, at which specialists offer advice and insight into the various tax advantages of investing in the UK.

Notable films
 The Laureate
 Madness in the Method
 The Comedian's Guide to Survival 
That Good Night 
Breakdown 
 Ibiza Undead
Heretiks   
Cottage Country
Night Train to Lisbon

Television

Documentaries

References

External links

Film production companies of the United Kingdom
Television production companies of the United Kingdom